Resapamea hedeni is a moth in the family Noctuidae. It is found from southern Europe to Japan.

Subspecies
Resapamea hedeni hedeni (south-eastern Europe, southern Urals, southern Siberia, Inner Mongolia, the Kuriles, Japan: Hokkaido)
Resapamea hedeni rhodochrea (Varga & L. Ronkay, 1992) (western Tien Shan)
Resapamea hedeni takanensis (Marumo, 1932) (Japan: Honshu)
Resapamea hedeni vargai (Hacker, 1988) (eastern Turkey)

References

Moths described in 1889
Hadeninae
Insects of Turkey